The 99th Illinois General Assembly convened on January 14, 2015, and adjourned sine die on January 10, 2017.

Legislation 

A total of 938 bills became law in the course of the 99th General Assembly.  Among these was a major overhaul of Illinois' family law statutes, as a result of which no-fault divorce became available in Illinois and heartbalm torts were abolished. The General Assembly also passed the nation's first law punishing companies for participating in the Boycott, Divestment and Sanctions movement.  

The Illinois Budget Impasse, which caused the state to go more than two years without a budget, began on July 1, 2015 and continued into the 100th General Assembly in 2017.

Senate

Of the Senate's 59 members, 19 stood for election in the 2014 Illinois Senate election. One district, the 36th, changed hands from the Democratic to the Republican Party.

Senate leadership

Party composition 

The Senate of the 99th General Assembly consisted of 20 Republicans and 39 Democrats.

State Senators

House

Party composition

The House of the 99th General Assembly consisted of 47 Republicans and 71 Democrats.

House leadership

State Representatives

References 

2015 in Illinois
2016 in Illinois
Illinois legislative sessions
2015 U.S. legislative sessions
2016 U.S. legislative sessions